James H. Haygood (January 10, 1924 - July 27, 2010) was an American politician who served in the Alabama House of Representatives from 1966 to 1970.

Life
Haygood was born on January 10, 1924, to Jessie J. Haygood and Mary L. Killen. He graduated from Central High School. He registered for the U.S. Navy on June 30, 1942. On September 6, 1943, he married Pauline Hurst in Colbert, Alabama. He died on July 27, 2010, at the age of 86.

Politics
He was elected for the first seat of District 1 of the Alabama House of Representatives in 1966 and served from 1966 to 1970. He didn't serve in any other politics.

References

1924 births
2010 deaths
People from Lauderdale County, Alabama
Members of the Alabama House of Representatives
United States Navy personnel of World War II